Peter James Hallam (born 7 May 1995) is an English retired figure skater. He is the 2018 Toruń Cup silver medalist, the 2015 Golden Bear of Zagreb silver medalist, the 2019 Bavarian Open bronze medalist, the 2019 British national champion, and a six-time British national silver medalist (2014–2018, 2022).

Career 
Hallam began learning to skate in 2004. He competed at four ISU Junior Grand Prix events, from 2011 to 2013, and won the British junior men's title in the 2012–13 season.

Hallam's senior international debut came at the Bavarian Open in February 2014. He won his first senior national medal, silver, at the British Championships in November 2014. In November 2015, he stood on his first senior international podium, taking silver at the Golden Bear of Zagreb in Croatia. In January 2018, he won silver at the Toruń Cup in Poland.

In February 2019, Hallam won bronze at the Bavarian Open in Germany. He was chosen to represent the U.K. at the 2019 World Championships, in Saitama, Japan.

He announced his retirement on 6 December 2021.

Programs

Competitive highlights 
CS: Challenger Series; JGP: Junior Grand Prix

References

External links 
 

1995 births
Living people
British male single skaters
Sportspeople from Sheffield